The First Family is an American syndicated sitcom that premiered on September 22, 2012. The series follows the 45th president of the United States William Johnson (Christopher B. Duncan), who tries to handle his duties as the leader of the United States and as a family man to his wife Katherine (Kellita Smith) and their four children, while also having to deal with the escapades of his bickering sister-in-law Pauletta (Jackée Harry) and father Alvin (John Witherspoon). The following is a list of episodes of the program.

Series overview

Episodes

Season 1 (2012–13)

Season 2 (2013–15)

References 

General references 
 
 

Lists of American sitcom episodes